Sura is a rural locality (a selo) and the administrative center of Surskoye Rural Settlement of Pinezhsky District, Arkhangelsk Oblast, Russia. The population was 727 as of 2010. There are 11 streets.

Geography 
Sura is located 91 km southeast of Karpogory (the district's administrative centre) by road. Pakhurovo is the nearest rural locality.

References 

Rural localities in Pinezhsky District
Pinezhsky Uyezd